David Estrada (born December 19, 1978) is a Guatemalan and Mexican-American boxer who is from Chicago.

Amateur career
Estrada started his amateur career in Chicago. He won several titles, including the Chicago Park District Championship in 1993, the PAL National Championship in 1997, and the Texas State Golden Gloves Championship in 1998. His amateur record was 50-10-13, with David nationally ranked as high as seventh in the United States.

Professional career
David turned pro in Chicago while training at Chicago's at the Windy City Boxing Gym. After living in Miami for many years, he returned to Chicago.

Early Bouts
David was only 4-0 when he upset Matias Rios 7-0 from Buenos Aires, Argentina after dropping him in the first with a unanimous decision on Galavision TV.

Estrada beat Eric Pinero of Puerto Rico, dropping him in the first round, and later winning via a third round TKO on Florida’s Sunshine Network TV. He also won over Richard Hall from North Carolina on the Andrew 'Six-Heads' Lewis, card in New York City.

Estrada defeated Charles Clark, dropping him in the first round and stopping him by TKO in the fifth round while in the southpaw stance, live on ESPN2. David defeated Luke Leal after pounding him with body shots, dropping him twice live on Telemundo TV. In 2004 and 2005, David beat two fighters back-to-back with a combined record of 33-0-1.

Recent Fights
In April 2010, Estrada secured a top ten ranking by administering a brutal beating to 26-0-1 Orlando Lora, stopping him in eight brutal rounds. Estrada won every round, landing lightning fast counter right hands that broke apart Lora's undefended face on ESPN 2. Estrada, who fell short against the likes of Shane Mosley, Kermit Cintron, Andre Berto, Luis Abregu and Jesus Karass, proved a class above the previously undefeated Lora. Estrada's turnaround improvement can be credited to Estradas new outlook on his boxing career, Estrada believes he was his worst enemy in the past. On December 17, 2010, Estrada knocked out opponent Franklin Gonzalez in the fifth round of a scheduled ten rounder at UIC Pavilion in Chicago.

Boxing 360 Arbitration Hearing

Estrada is legally contractually promoted by the Boxing 360 promotional group in New York City led by Mario Yagobi. In June 2011, Boxing 360 won an arbitration hearing in New York City against Estrada and stablemate Angel Hernandez of Chicago. The American Arbitration Association in the City of New York ruled in favor of Boxing 360 as Estrada and Hernandez' promoters through February 15, 2013, as well as denying the boxer's claims for injunctive relief. David Estrada remains "Under contract with Boxing 360. My main goal was to show, as a relatively new boxing promoter, everyone in boxing that fighters can't pull that stuff with Boxing 360. We proved Boxing 360 will fight for what it believes in," noted Dr. Mario Yagobi (Boxing Promoter), founder, president and CEO of Boxing 360, whose group continues official promotional representation of Estrada. “We represent David Estrada. If he does not want to fight, his contract will go on suspension until he fights (for us), ” noted Dr. Yagobi.

Big Knockout Boxing career
On August 16, 2014, Estrada faced Eddie Caminero for the inaugural Big Knockout Boxing (BKB) junior middleweight title. Estrada defeated Caminero by unanimous decision. In his first defense on April 4, 2015, Estrada lost his title by unanimous decision to Khurshid Abdullaev.

Professional boxing record

| style="text-align:center;" colspan="8"|26 Wins (16 knockouts, 10 decisions),  6 Losses (3 knockouts, 3 decisions), 0 Draws
|-  style="text-align:center; background:#e3e3e3;"
|  style="border-style:none none solid solid; "|Res.
|  style="border-style:none none solid solid; "|Record
|  style="border-style:none none solid solid; "|Opponent
|  style="border-style:none none solid solid; "|Type
|  style="border-style:none none solid solid; "|Rd., Time
|  style="border-style:none none solid solid; "|Date
|  style="border-style:none none solid solid; "|Location
|  style="border-style:none none solid solid; "|Notes
|- align=center
|Win
|align=center|26-6||align=left| Rahman Mustafa Yusubov
|
|
|
|align=left|
|align=left|
|- align=center
|Win
|align=center|25-6||align=left| Franklin Gonzalez
|
|
|
|align=left|
|align=left|
|- align=center
|Win
|align=center|24-6||align=left| Orlando Lora
|
|
|
|align=left|
|align=left|
|- align=center
|Win
|align=center|23-6||align=left| Chris Gray
|
|
|
|align=left|
|align=left|
|- align=center
|Loss
|align=center|22-6||align=left| Luis Carlos Abregu
|
|
|
|align=left|
|align=left|
|- align=center
|Loss
|align=center|22-5||align=left| Jesus Soto Karass
|
|
|
|align=left|
|align=left|
|- align=center
|Win
|align=center|22-4||align=left| Alexander Pacheco Quiroz
|
|
|
|align=left|
|align=left|
|- align=center
|Loss
|align=center|21-4||align=left| Andre Berto
|
|
|
|align=left|
|align=left|
|- align=center
|Win
|align=center|21-3||align=left| Luther Smith
|
|
|
|align=left|
|align=left|
|- align=center
|Win
|align=center|20-3||align=left| David Toribio
|
|
|
|align=left|
|align=left|
|- align=center
|Win
|align=center|19-3||align=left| Clarence Taylor
|
|
|
|align=left|
|align=left|
|- align=center
|Loss
|align=center|18-3||align=left| Kermit Cintron
|
|
|
|align=left|
|align=left|
|- align=center
|Loss
|align=center|18-2||align=left| Shane Mosley
|
|
|
|align=left|
|align=left|
|- align=center
|Win
|align=center|18-1||align=left| Chris Smith
|
|
|
|align=left|
|align=left|
|- align=center
|Win
|align=center|17-1||align=left| Nurhan Suleymanoglu
|
|
|
|align=left|
|align=left|
|- align=center
|Win
|align=center|16-1||align=left| Nelson Manchego
|
|
|
|align=left|
|align=left|
|- align=center
|Loss
|align=center|15-1||align=left| Ishe Smith
|
|
|
|align=left|
|align=left|
|- align=center
|Win
|align=center|15-0||align=left| Vincent Harris
|
|
|
|align=left|
|align=left|
|- align=center
|Win
|align=center|14-0||align=left| Armando Velardez
|
|
|
|align=left|
|align=left|
|- align=center
|Win
|align=center|13-0||align=left| Joel Salas
|
|
|
|align=left|
|align=left|
|- align=center
|Win
|align=center|12-0||align=left| Vincent Harris
|
|
|
|align=left|
|align=left|
|- align=center
|Win
|align=center|11-0||align=left| Luke Leal
|
|
|
|align=left|
|align=left|
|- align=center
|Win
|align=center|10-0||align=left| Charles Clark
|
|
|
|align=left|
|align=left|
|- align=center
|Win
|align=center|9-0||align=left| Reggie Davis
|
|
|
|align=left|
|align=left|
|- align=center
|Win
|align=center|8-0||align=left| Richard Hall
|
|
|
|align=left|
|align=left|
|- align=center
|Win
|align=center|7-0||align=left| Alton Madison
|
|
|
|align=left|
|align=left|
|- align=center
|Win
|align=center|6-0||align=left| Eric Pinero
|
|
|
|align=left|
|align=left|
|- align=center
|Win
|align=center|5-0||align=left| Matias Anibal Rios
|
|
|
|align=left|
|align=left|
|- align=center
|Win
|align=center|4-0||align=left| Linncorrea Strong
|
|
|
|align=left|
|align=left|
|- align=center
|Win
|align=center|3-0||align=left| Bobby Butters
|
|
|
|align=left|
|align=left|
|- align=center
|Win
|align=center|2-0||align=left| Terry Ford
|
|
|
|align=left|
|align=left|
|- align=center
|Win
|align=center|1-0||align=left| Tyrone Handy
|
|
|
|align=left|
|align=left|
|- align=center

Big Knockout Boxing record

|-
|align="center" colspan=9|1 Win (0 knockouts), 1 Loss, 0 Draws
|-
| align="center" style="border-style: none none solid solid; background: #e3e3e3"|Res.
| align="center" style="border-style: none none solid solid; background: #e3e3e3"|Record
| align="center" style="border-style: none none solid solid; background: #e3e3e3"|Opponent
| align="center" style="border-style: none none solid solid; background: #e3e3e3"|Type
| align="center" style="border-style: none none solid solid; background: #e3e3e3"|Rd, Time
| align="center" style="border-style: none none solid solid; background: #e3e3e3"|Date
| align="center" style="border-style: none none solid solid; background: #e3e3e3"|Location
| align="center" style="border-style: none none solid solid; background: #e3e3e3"|Event
| align="center" style="border-style: none none solid solid; background: #e3e3e3"|Notes
|-align=center
|Loss
|1–1
| align=left| Khurshid Abdullaev
|  |||| 
|align=left| 
|align=left|
|align=left|
|-align=center
|Win
|1–0
| align=left| Eddie Caminero
|  |||| 
|align=left| 
|align=left|
|align=left|

References

External links
 
 Boxing360 - David Estrada Professional Bio

1978 births
Living people
American male boxers
American people of Guatemalan descent
American sportspeople of North American descent
Sportspeople of Guatemalan descent